This is a list of the mayors and lord mayors of the City of Melbourne, a local government area of Victoria, Australia.

Mayors (1842–1902)

Lord mayors (1902–1980)
The title of "Lord Mayor" was conferred on the position of mayor by King Edward VII on 18 December 1902.

Commissioners (1981–1982)

Lord mayors (1982–1993)

Commissioners (1993–1996)

Lord mayors (since 1996)

Electoral history

See also
 Melbourne Town Hall
 List of Town Halls in Melbourne
 Local government areas of Victoria

References

Lords Mayor of Melbourne

External links
List of Mayors at RULERS
Melbourne City Council

Melbourne

Mayors Melbourne City
Mayors Melbourne City
City of Melbourne